The Divide County Courthouse in Crosby, North Dakota was built in 1917.  It was designed by architects Buechner & Orth in Beaux Arts style.  It was listed on the National Register of Historic Places in 1980.

According to its NRHP nomination, its "interior features terrazzo floors and dark wood trim in an austere version of the
usual Buechner and Orth treatment."

References

Courthouses on the National Register of Historic Places in North Dakota
County courthouses in North Dakota
Beaux-Arts architecture in North Dakota
Government buildings completed in 1917
National Register of Historic Places in Divide County, North Dakota
1917 establishments in North Dakota